Tristan Muyumba Nkita (born 7 March 1997) is a French footballer who plays as a midfielder for Ligue 2 club EA Guingamp.

Club career

Monaco

Muyumba made his professional debut on 26 April 2017 in the Coupe de France semi-final against Paris Saint-Germain. He started the game  and played the whole match in a 5–0 away loss.

EA Guingamp
After a half year at Toulon, Muyumba moved to the B-team of EA Guingamp in July 2020.

International career
Born in France, Muyumba is of Congolese descent. He is a youth international for France.

Career statistics

Club 
(Correct as of 26 April 2017)

References

External links

Tristan Muyumba Nkita at AS Monaco

1997 births
Living people
Footballers from Paris
French sportspeople of Democratic Republic of the Congo descent
French expatriate footballers
AS Monaco FC players
Cercle Brugge K.S.V. players
SC Toulon players
En Avant Guingamp players
Association football midfielders
Challenger Pro League players
Ligue 1 players
Ligue 2 players
Championnat National players
Championnat National 2 players
Expatriate footballers in Belgium
French expatriate sportspeople in Belgium
French footballers
Black French sportspeople